Kurşunlu is a coastline within the border of Gemlik district in Bursa Province of Turkey, and is one of the ancient sub-districts of the Bursa.

History 
In Gündoğdu, a village amongst the Kurşunlu hills, there is an ancient monastery called St. Aberkios Monastery. This monastery is identified with the Byzantine-era Elegmoi monastery. However, the general public is not aware of its existence, and it stands there abandoned. According to the new project of the Kurşunlu municipality, it has been declared that the Hagios Aberkios will soon be turned into a museum.

Beaches of Turkey
Landforms of Bursa Province
Villages in İnegöl District